Loxodonta exoptata is an extinct species of elephant in the genus Loxodonta, from Africa. A 2009 study suggested that Loxodonta exoptata gave rise to L. atlantica, which gave rise to L. africana. The molars of L. exoptata are distinguished from later loxodonts by the lower plate number and their specialized enamel loops. Fossil remains of L. exoptata have been found at Pliocene sites in eastern Africa including Laetoli and Koobi Fora.

References

Prehistoric elephants
Pliocene proboscideans
Pliocene extinctions
Pliocene mammals of Africa
Fossil taxa described in 1941